Harry Wilson (born 22 March 1997) is a Welsh professional footballer who plays as a winger for  club Fulham and the Wales national team.

In October 2013, Wilson became the youngest player to play for Wales, at the age of 16 years and 207 days, beating a record previously held by Gareth Bale. He also became Liverpool's youngest international. Wilson also helped Wales qualify for the FIFA World Cup in 2022 for the first time since 1958.

Club career

Liverpool

Born in Wrexham, Wilson was schooled at Ysgol Dinas Brân in Llangollen. He first signed to Liverpool as a member of the U9s squad. At the age of 15 he became a full-time member of the Liverpool Academy squad. During the 2012–13 campaign, Wilson featured for the U18s and was a regular face in the U16 side. For the beginning of the next season, he was promoted to the U18s full-time. In 2014, Wilson was joint top scorer with fellow Liverpool youngster Sheyi Ojo at the Ajax Future Cup.

In July 2014, Wilson signed his first professional contract with the club. He competed in the 2014–15 UEFA Youth League in which Liverpool reached the last 16, and scored an 88th-minute winner in a 3–2 home win over Real Madrid on 22 October 2014.

On 11 July 2015, Wilson was named in Liverpool's 30-man squad for their pre-season tour of Thailand, Australia and Malaysia. On 16 August he was crowned best forward of the 2015 PSV Otten Cup.

On 26 August 2015, Wilson joined League One side Crewe Alexandra on a youth loan deal for four months until 5 January 2016. He made his debut against Millwall as a 67th-minute substitute for David Fox in a 1–3 loss at Gresty Road on 12 September, and his first start in a goalless draw away to Burton Albion on 20 October. Wilson was recalled from his loan spell on 1 December.

On 28 July 2016, Wilson signed a new contract with Liverpool, and was shortly named the under-23 captain. He made his first team debut for the club on 18 January 2017, in a 1–0 away win over Plymouth Argyle in an FA Cup third round replay, replacing Philippe Coutinho in the 65th minute.

Wilson was named Liverpool Academy Players' Player of the Year for the 2017–18 season.

Loan to Hull City

On 31 January 2018, Wilson signed a new deal with Liverpool and was loaned to Hull City until the end of the season. He made his  debut coming off the bench in the 69th minute as a replacement for Fraizer Campbell in a 2–1 Championship defeat against Preston North End at Deepdale on 3 February.

He scored his first professional goal in his second appearance a week later in a 0–2 away win at Nottingham Forest. The following month, he scored two goals and recorded two assists to help Hull away from the relegation zone and won the club's Player of the Month award for March. He also won the EFL Championship PFA Player of the Month award for April 2018. He scored 7 goals in 13 league appearances for Hull during his loan spell.

Loan to Derby County
On 10 July 2018, Wilson signed a new five-year contract at Liverpool. A week later, he joined Championship club Derby County on a season-long loan, linking up with fellow Wales players Tom Lawrence and Joe Ledley.

He made his debut for the club managed by Frank Lampard on 3 August, starting as they began their season with a 2–1 win at Reading. On 22 September, he scored his first Rams goal to equalise as they came from behind to win 3–1 at home to Brentford. Three days later, he did the same with a bending 30-yard free kick in the third round of the EFL Cup away to Manchester United and scored in an 8–7 penalty shootout win after a 2–2 draw.

Loan to AFC Bournemouth
Wilson joined Premier League club AFC Bournemouth on 6 August 2019 on loan for the 2019–20 season. On 17 August, he scored the first goal of his senior career on his Bournemouth début against Aston Villa in a 2–1 away win. On 25 August 2019, he scored a free kick from just outside the box against Manchester City in a 3–1 loss at home. In March 2020, he was criticised for wearing a Liverpool coat while watching Bournemouth play them.

Loan to Cardiff City
On 16 October 2020, Wilson joined Championship club Cardiff City on a season-long loan. He made his debut for the club on 18 October as a first half substitute in place of Greg Cunningham in a 1–0 victory over Preston North End, before scoring his first goal in a 1–1 draw with former club Bournemouth three days later. He scored his first professional hat trick in a 4–0 away win at Birmingham City on 1 May 2021.

Fulham
On 24 July 2021, Wilson joined Championship side Fulham on an initial loan deal from Liverpool followed by a permanent transfer and a four-year contract. He scored on his Fulham debut in a 1–1 draw with Middlesbrough on 8 August.

International career
Having represented Wales in the Victory Shield and at under-17 level and impressing manager Chris Coleman with his performances, in October 2013, Wilson was called up by the Wales national football team at the age of 16. An unused substitute in a 1–0 victory over Macedonia on 11 October, Wilson made his debut four days later against Belgium, when he came on as a substitute for Hal Robson-Kanu in the 87th minute. Upon making this appearance he became the youngest player to play for Wales, beating the previous record holder Gareth Bale by 108 days. He also became Liverpool's youngest international at the age of 16 years and 207 days, beating the record previously held by Raheem Sterling who represented England for the first time in November 2012 at the age of 17 years and 342 days. He was praised by Coleman, who said: "Now he has had a little taste of it, that cements his future with Wales for the next 10 or 15 years"; the manager also spoke of England's interest in the player. Wilson's maternal grandfather Peter Edwards earned around £125,000 after placing a £50 bet with William Hill on his grandson becoming an international footballer, when he was aged just 18 months.

In June 2015, Wilson again joined up with the senior Welsh squad for a post-season training camp in Cardiff. On 20 March 2017, he replaced the injured Tom Lawrence in the Wales squad for the World Cup qualifier against the Republic of Ireland.

Wilson was included in Wales' squad for the China Cup in March 2018. On his first international start, against hosts China, he scored his first goal in a 6–0 semi-final win. The game was also on his 21st birthday. On 16 October that year, Wales travelled to play the Republic of Ireland in the UEFA Nations League without Bale and Aaron Ramsey, and Wilson scored the only goal with a long-range free kick similar to his recent one for Derby against Manchester United; Wales manager Ryan Giggs, formerly of United, joked that "I thought about fining him after he scored at Old Trafford but I won't be fining him now". In May 2021 he was selected for the Wales squad for the delayed UEFA Euro 2020 tournament. In November 2022 he was named in the Wales squad for the 2022 FIFA World Cup in Qatar, in which he appeared in all three of Wales' games.

Career statistics

Club

International

As of match played 29 November 2022. Wales' score listed first, score column indicates score after each Wilson goal.

Honours
Fulham
 EFL Championship: 2021–22

Wales
 China Cup runner-up: 2018

Individual
 EFL Championship PFA Player of the Month: April 2018
 Liverpool Academy Player of the Season: 2017–18
 EFL Championship Team of the Season: 2021–22
 PFA Team of the Year: 2021–22 Championship

References

External links

Profile at the Fulham F.C. website

1997 births
Living people
Footballers from Wrexham
Welsh footballers
Association football wingers
Liverpool F.C. players
Crewe Alexandra F.C. players
Hull City A.F.C. players
Derby County F.C. players
AFC Bournemouth players
Cardiff City F.C. players 
Fulham F.C. players
English Football League players
Premier League players
Wales youth international footballers
Wales under-21 international footballers
Wales international footballers
UEFA Euro 2020 players
2022 FIFA World Cup players